Santiago Metro Line 5 is one of the seven lines that currently make up the Santiago Metro network in Santiago, Chile. It has 30 stations and 30 km of track. The line intersects with Line 1 at Baquedano station and San Pablo station, with Line 2 at Santa Ana station, with the Line 3 at both Plaza de Armas station and Irarrázaval station, with Line 4 at Vicente Valdés station, and with line 6 at Ñuble station. It will also intersect and the future Line 7 at Baquedano station. Its distinctive colour on the network line map is green.

In 2015, Line 5 accounted for 20.8% of all trips made on the metro system with a daily ridership of 396,100.

History

Line 5 was opened to the public on April 5, 1997 by President Eduardo Frei Ruiz-Tagle at Bellavista de La Florida station. It initially ran only between Bellavista de La Florida station and Baquedano station and used modern NS-93 trains imported from France. It was particularly welcomed by people living in the southern districts of Santiago and the area around Vicuña Mackenna Avenue, who saw their commute time to the centre of the city drastically reduced.

It was the first train line in Chile to make mass use of elevated viaducts in its structure, the viaduct carrying the section of track between Ñuble station and Mirador station, with the remainder running underground (However it wasn't the first line to incorporate elevated viaducts; that honor belongs to the line 2, with Parque O'Higgins metro station being the only elevated station on the aforementioned line, with an elevated viaduct running briefly to the north.)

On March 4, 2000, Line 5 was extended to the east from Baquedano station to Santa Ana station. This extension included a station at Plaza de Armas central square, allowing commuters to interchange with Line 2 (in Santa Ana), reducing travel time between the centre and the east of the city.

The line was extended again on March 31, 2004, opening Quinta Normal station and Cumming station to the public. Quinta Normal station is one of the biggest on the Metro network, with space for hosting cultural events, and connects to Quinta Normal Park, where the Chilean National Museum of Natural History and a branch of the Santiago Museum of Contemporary Art are located.

On November 30, 2005, Vicente Valdés station was opened at the southern end of Line 5, serving as an interchange point with Line 4. It also provided a larger hub for the influx of people coming up from Line 4 than Bellavista de La Florida station.

On November 17, 2008, an express service began to run on Line 4 at peak times, stopping at certain stations only to allow for faster journeys.

The first section of a new extension to Pudahuel station in the east of Santiago opened on January 13, 2011, followed by the second part, to Plaza de Maipú station, in December of the same year.

On November 2, 2017, Line 6 was inaugurated, intersecting line 5 with line 6 at Ñuble station.

Libertad station
Libertad is a ghost station on Line 5 located between Quinta Normal station and Cumming station. The station was never finished and never opened, due to the low density of population living in the area or traveling through it.

October 2019 protests

In October 2019, the metro network suffered major damage to its stations because of protests. Nine stations on Line 5 suffered moderate damage (Gruta de Lourdes, Barrancas, Las Parcelas, Pedrero, Cumming, San Joaquín, Pudahuel, Laguna Sur and Del Sol); those stations had fires within the mezzanine area. Due to the lesser amount of damages on Line 5 compared to some areas of the metro network, full service on the line was expected to resume within two months of the end of the protests.

Service on Line 5 was partially restored on October 25, 2019, with express service between Quinta Normal and Vicente Valdes. As of September 7, 2020, The line is fully restored.

NS-2016 cars

On November 9, 2020. NS-2016 cars began operations on this line, which will replace NS74 cars.

Communes served by Line 5

Line 5 serves the following communes from west to east:

Maipú
Pudahuel
Lo Prado
Quinta Normal
Santiago
Providencia
Ñuñoa
Macul
San Joaquín
La Florida

Tren Expreso (Express Service) 

The skip-stop express service works during peak hours and allows trains to stop at alternate stations, reducing the number of stops and the duration of journeys. The stations on the line are divided into “green route” stations, “red route” stations and “common” stations (Spanish: estación común), where all trains stop and allow passengers to switch between red and green routes. The express service works from Monday to Friday, between 6am - 9am and 6pm - 9pm.

Red Route Stations 
Santiago Bueras
Monte Tabor
Barrancas
Blanqueado
Quinta Normal
Parque Bustamante
Rodrigo de Araya
Camino Agrícola
Mirador

Green Route Stations 
Del Sol
Las Parcelas
Lo Prado
Gruta de Lourdes
Cumming
Santa Isabel
Carlos Valdovinos
Pedrero

Common Stations 
There are 13 stations where both red and green route trains stop. They are the busiest stations and give commuters the chance to change between routes.
Plaza de Maipú
Laguna Sur
Pudahuel
San Pablo 
Santa Ana 
Plaza de Armas 
Bellas Artes
Baquedano  
Irarrázaval 
Ñuble 
San Joaquín
Bellavista de La Florida
Vicente Valdés

Stations

Line 5 stations from west to east are:

Line 5 data sheet
Terminal Communes:La Florida – Maipú
Track:
Avenida Vicuña Mackenna: 8 stations
Avenida General Bustamante: 5 stations
Calle Monjitas: 1 station
Calle Catedral: 4 stations
Avenida San Pablo: 5 stations
Avenida Teniente Cruz: 2 stations
Avenida Pajaritos: 5 stations
Construction Method:
Plaza de Maipú station - Del Sol station: Underground
Monte Tabor station - Laguna Sur station: Viaduct
Barrancas station - Irarrázaval: Underground
Ñuble station - Mirador station: Viaduct
Bellavista de La Florida station - Vicente Valdés station: Underground
Opening Dates:
Bellavista de La Florida metro station – Baquedano: April 1997
Baquedano station – Santa Ana station: March 2000
Santa Ana station – Quinta Normal station: March 2004
Vicente Valdés metro station – Bellavista de La Florida metro station: November 2005
Quinta Normal metro station – Pudahuel station: January 2010
Pudahuel station – Plaza de Maipú station: February 2011

See also 
List of metro systems
Rail transport in Chile
Transantiago
Rubber-tyred metro

References

External links

 Metro S.A.
 UrbanRail.net/Santiago
 Santiago Metro Map
 Tarjeta Bip! contactless cards
 Plan and Authority of Transit of Santiago de Chile, Transantiago